Ostrog may refer to:

Ostrog, Slovenia, a settlement in Šentjernej municipality in Slovenia
Ostrog monastery, a Serbian Orthodox Christian monastery in Montenegro
Ostroh, a historic town in Ukraine
Ostrog (fortress), a Russian term for a small fortress